The Aida Foster Theatre School for drama, dance and education was founded by Aida Foster in 1929 as a hobby to teach dancing. It expanded over the years to become one of Britain's foremost stage schools. Many stage and film personalities of the 20th Century received their professional education and arranged their first employment through the school. Run by Aida, and later by her daughter Anita Foster, it catered for three different groups of students: those that undertook dance training only, younger pupils that had full education plus both dancing and drama training, and older students taking drama training only.

The Aida Foster School supplied many of the pantomime "babes" (children's choruses and parts) for the West End Christmas shows of the 1950s. They also obtained modelling contracts for many of the juveniles.

Foster had started a theatrical agency associated with the school in 1944. Following the death of her husband she closed the school in 1970 to concentrate on the agency with her daughter Anita.

The school was situated on Finchley Road in Golders Green, London, just north of the junction with Golders Green Road.

Alumni
Notable alumni include:
 film actress Jean Simmons
 Carry On actress Barbara Windsor
 actress Kate O'Mara
 actress Vicki Michelle
 actress Shirley Eaton
 singer and actress Elaine Paige
 singer and actress Marti Webb (who became Head Girl)
 actress Dilys Laye
 artist Sara Leighton
 actress Perlita Neilson
 child actor and musician Paul Layton
 actor Robin Davies
actresses Linda and Jane Hayden

References

External links
  BritishPathe Aida Foster School video newsreel film 

 

Ballet schools in the United Kingdom
Dance schools in the United Kingdom
Drama schools in London
Defunct schools in the London Borough of Barnet
Educational institutions established in 1929
1929 establishments in England
Educational institutions disestablished in 1970
1970 disestablishments in England